Tonalá may refer to:

Places
Santo Domingo Tonalá, a municipality in the Mexican state of Oaxaca
Tonalá, Jalisco, a municipality in the Mexican state of Jalisco
Tonalá, Chiapas, a municipality in the Mexican state of Chiapas
Tonalá (Maya site), an archaeological site of the pre-Columbian Maya civilization, in the Chiapas highlands

Other
Tonalá River, in Southeastern Mexico